The amaMfengu  (in the Xhosa language Mfengu, plural amafengu) was a reference of Xhosa clans whose ancestors were refugees that fled from the Mfecane in the early-mid 19th century to seek land and protection from the Xhosa. These refugees were assimilated into the Xhosa nation and were officially recognized by the then king, Hintsa. The term derives from the Xhosa verb "ukumfenguza" which means to wander about seeking service.

During the 6th Frontier War, they were promised by the Cape Colony independence from the oppressive Xhosa government and would be given their own land which would be called Fingoland, the southwestern portion of Eastern Xhosaland, in the Eastern Cape of South Africa.

History

Formation and early history
The name amaMfengu translates as "wanderers" and the Mfengu people – like the Bhaca, Bhele, Hlubi and Dlamini peoples – was formed from the tribes that were broken up and dispersed by Shaka and his Zulu armies in the Mfecane wars.

Most of them fled westwards and settled amongst the Xhosa. After some years of oppression by the Gcaleka Xhosa (who called the Fengu people their "dogs")in the 1820s, they formed an alliance with the Cape government in 1835 and Sir Benjamin d'Urban invited 17,000 to settle on the banks of the Great Fish River in the region that later became known as the Ciskei.
Some scholars, including Timothy Stapleton and Alan Webster, argue that the traditional narrative of the Fengu people as refugees of the Mfecane is in fact a lie constructed by colonial missionaries and administrators. They question the existence of the Fengu people as a distinct group prior to colonial contact, instead positing that the term was coined by the British government in the Cape Colony to describe a collection of Xhosa defectors, migrant laborers, and labor captives.

Early frontier wars (1835–56)
They subsequently became notable allies of the Cape Colony in the frontier wars against their former oppressors. In this capacity, they won several victories against their Xhosa enemies (particularly the Gcaleka Xhosa), and through shrewd and successful management of regional trade, formed a developed and materially successful nation. In addition, many bought farms and started businesses in the small towns that were springing up in that part of the Cape frontier.

The Cattle-killing movement (1856–58)

The Fengu people did not take part in the great cattle-killing in 1857, which devastated the Xhosa people.

While the Xhosa slaughtered their own cattle and burnt their crops, many of the Fengu people instead bought the Xhosa cattle at very low prices, only to resell them at a profit during the subsequent famine. They also were recorded as producing large excesses of grain at this time for their starving neighbours. The famine induced by the cattle-killing effectively brought much of the armed resistance in the eastern Cape to an end.

The Fengu-Gcaleka War (1877–79)
Over a decade of relative peace and economic development, which peaked in the mid-1870s, was brought to an end by a series of devastating droughts across the Transkei, which began to place severe strain on intertribal relations. Their severity increased up until 1877, when the last major war that the Fengu people fought, the Ninth Frontier War, broke out after a bar fight between Fengu and Gcaleka guests, at a Fengu wedding. Many Fengu people were Cape citizens by this time, so the Cape Colony took a partisan view of the war, which brought it into conflict with the Gcaleka forces.

The Cape government appointed the Fengu Captain Bikitsha to co-lead the Cape's forces (composed primarily of Fengu, Thembu and Boer commandos) in the war. They inflicted a string of crushing defeats on the enemy and dispersed their armies in the space of only three weeks. The ingratitude of Cape Colony governor Sir Henry Bartle Frere, who promptly humiliated the Cape's Fengu allies by forcibly disarming them, caused the Fengu to begin to identify more with the Xhosa, partly also as a reaction to increasing persecution from the Colonial authorities.

Transkei and Ciskei

The Fengu lived in the Bantustans of Transkei and Ciskei, established by the Apartheid government. Ciskei was the scene of political rivalry between the Rharhabe and the Fengu as a result of the apartheid policy of "retribalisation", which resulted in resentment toward the historically better educated, and relatively economically advantaged Fengu, and this rivalry culminated in the election of Lennox Sebe, a Rharhabe, who replaced Fengu leader Chief Justice Thandathu Jongilizwe Mabandla in 1973, however Sebe subsequently abandoned his anti-Fengu rhetoric.

Christianity in the Fengu community

Christianity played a major role in the survival of the endangered Fengu people after the Mfecane wars. After contact with the Gcaleka Xhosa, who were hostile towards them, the Fengu people found comfort in Rev. John Ayliff, the missionary at Butterworth who devoted himself to the tribe for the next 30 years. In 1835, Ayliff led 17 000 and 22 000 head of cattle to Peddie On 14 May 1835, the Fengu people gathered under an old milkwood tree in the Peddie district, in the presence of Rev. John Ayliff, and swore an oath to obey the Queen, to accept Christianity, and to educate their children. This agreement became known as the 'Fingo-Oath'. Soon after accepting Christianity, the Fengu became the first Bantu in South Africa to use ploughs, demonstrated to them by the missionaries, and also the first to plant wheat. A small group moved to Tsitsikamma and carried their Christian customs with them. The Fengu, who were most Wesleyans, soon moved to Grahamstown where they fought on the side of the British in the eighth frontier war of 1850 to 1853 and were rewarded with land in a freehold village known as Fingo in Grahamstown in 1855. The educated Fengu went as far as Port Elizabeth, where they worked at the harbour and established urban communities in Cape Town, where they also continued practising as Christians. Since the day the 'Fingo-Oath' was sworn, 14 May has been celebrated as Fingo Emancipation Day and a ceremony held under the old milkwood tree where the oath was sworn.

Fengu people in Zimbabwe
After the occupation of Matebeleland in 1893, the Ndebele took up arms in an effort to re-establish the Ndebele State in 1896. Cecil John Rhodes brought a group of Fengu fighters (who had fought on the side of the British) and were known as "the Cape Boys" in 1896. After the war, Rhodes tried further to 'neutralise' the 'war-like' Ndebele people by inviting more Fengu people into Southern Rhodesia. "He promised the Fengus three 'reserves' on which they could settle with the proviso that each man would work for three months a year.  After 36 months of labour, each one would be given an individual title". More Fengu leaders moved to Southern Rhodesia as Wesleyan Methodists, Salvationists, Anglicans, Presbyterians and Lutherans. In 2000, the Mbembesi Fengu/Xhosa community celebrated their centenary in Zimbabwe. The Fengu in Zimbabwe, who are Xhosa speakers, are the subject of the first ever PHD thesis written in Xhosa by Dr Hleze Kunju titled IsiXhosa ulwimi lwabantu abangesosininzi eZimbabwe: Ukuphila nokulondolozwa kwaso (Xhosa as a Minority Language in Zimbabwe: Survival and Maintenance)

Veldtman Bikitsha (1829–1912)
For much of the 19th and early 20th century, the Fengu were led by Captain Veldtman Bikitsha. Initially a constable who was of great service to the Cape in the 8th Frontier War, he was later promoted and served as a de facto military leader of the Cape's Fengu commandos.

Prime Minister John Molteno, who held a very high opinion of Bikitsha, appointed him as a leader of the Cape forces (together with Chief Magistrate Charles Griffith) in the 9th Frontier War in 1877, where he swiftly won a string of brilliant victories against the Gcaleka. Throughout the 9th Frontier war, Bikitsha and his location were a focal point for the Gcaleka armies attacks and came under immense military pressure.

His military genius in the frontier wars earned him considerable renown and he was widely acknowledged leader in the Cape Colony. His courage was also frequently referred to. He famously once jumped onto a wounded and charging lion, holding it by the tail, overpowered it and killed it. He was invited to London in 1889, where Queen Victoria requested to meet him to thank him for his services. He reputedly told her "We have never feared a white man, and we have never lifted our hand against any of your people."

He founded the Transkei General Council, and served as a juror and commissioner for the Cape Colony in later life

John Tengo Jabavu (1859–1921)

As Fengu history switched from military defense to political struggle, so the great Fengu politician and activist John Tengo Jabavu rose in prominence after Bikitsha's military leadership ended.

Jabavu edited the first newspapers to be written in the Xhosa and from 1876 he edited Isigidimi samaXhosa ("The Xhosa Messenger"). From 1884 he edited Imvo Zabantsundu ("Black Opinion"). He wrote on the threat of Afrikaner nationalism, equal rights for South Africa's black population, and in support of women's rights.

The rivalry between the Fengu and the Gcaleka Xhosa, which had previously broken out into war, declined during the era of Jabavu's leadership, as greater unity was encouraged. Nonetheless, some divisions remained. Jabavu's main political rival, Walter Rubusana, was Xhosa. Rubusana's rise in the 1890s was through the new Gcaleka-dominated South African Native National Congress and their newspaper Izwi Labantu ("The Voice of the People") which was financed by Cecil Rhodes. The rise of Xhosa institutions meant that Jabavu and the Fengu were no longer in a position to provide the only leadership in the Cape's Black community.

Over the next few decades, divisions persisted between Jabavu's movement Imbumba ("The Union") and Rubusana's South African Native National Congress. However the rivalry was finally laid to rest and there was union under the newly named African National Congress. One of the early aims of this movement was finally to lay to rest "the aberrations of the Xhosa-Fingo feud."

British annexation
British Kaffraria had been annexed to the Cape Colony in 1866. Barring the brief revolt in 1877 and 1878, when the Gcaleka turned upon their Fengu neighbours, the British annexation of land east of the Kei River proceeded fitfully, but generally unimpeded. In September 1879 this was followed by Idutywa Reserve and Fenguland, and Gcalekaland in 1885. It is assumed that the restructuring of these territories into the divisions of Butterworth, Idutywa, Centani, Nqamakwe, Tsomo and Willowvale dates from these times.

Social change and adaptability
Originally farmers, the Fengu people had quickly built themselves schools, created and edited their own newspapers, and translated international literature into their language. The reason that the Fengu people were able to adapt so effectively to changing circumstances (like the coming of capitalism and urbanisation) was because they lacked a fixed tribal social-structure and hierarchy (having presumably lost it in their earlier flight from the Zulu). This state of social change and flexibility allowed them to quickly adjust to the European expansion, learn and adapt new techniques, and take advantage of the upheavals that followed. Other tribes were often suspicious of outside ideas and consequently resisted any change to meet the colonial threat. The Fengu had no paramount-chief as other tribes did, but the Cape Commander, Veldman Bikitsha, was a Fengu and held authority over the Fengu's military capacity.

Many Fengu have also subsequently intermarried with other ethnic groups, particularly with the Xhosa and Zulu, while some still live in Zimbabwe.

Territory

The region that was later known as the Transkei was originally divided into territories known as the Idutywa Reserve, Fingoland and Galekaland (Gcalekaland). Fingoland lay the borderlands in the far south of the Transkei, just north of the Kei River.

Following their annexation by the British however, they were restructured into the divisions of Butterworth, Tsomo and Ngqamakwe for Fingoland; Centani and Willowvale for Galekaland; and Idutywa for the Idutywa Reserve.

Present-day South Africa 
Today virtually all the Fengu people have intermarried with other ethnic groups particularly with the Xhosa and Zulu. Many are now often considered – especially by outsiders – to be ethnically Xhosa and others Zulu, because of their common language and some similar customs. A considerable number have a mixed racial background, especially in and around the Cape provinces.

See also
 Mgolombane Sandile
 Xhosa clan names
 Xhosa Wars
 Fingoland
 Fingo Festival

References

Xhosa-speaking peoples
Ethnic groups in South Africa